Hermanos is a 1939 Argentine drama film directed by Enrique de Rosas. The film premiered in Buenos Aires and starred José Gola and Amelia Bence.

Cast

Amelia Bence
José Gola

References

External links

1939 films
1930s Spanish-language films
Argentine black-and-white films
1939 drama films
Argentine drama films
1930s Argentine films